A Sereia de Pedra, known as Sirène de Pierre in France, is a 1923 Portuguese and French silent drama film directed by Roger Lion. The film was based on a story by Virginia de Castro e Almeida.

The film premiered in Paris on 2 April 1923, and was also shown in Brazil.

Cast
Maria Emília Castelo Branco as  Maria 
Gil Clary as  Leonor 
Max Maxudian as  Pedro the metal-smith / Convent keeper 
Arthur Duarte as  Miguel Alves, the archeologist 
Nestor Lopes as  Cláudio 
Francisco Sena as  Fragoso, the eremit 
Manuel Grilo as  António, the bullfighter

External links
 

1923 films
French silent feature films
Portuguese silent films
Portuguese black-and-white films
1923 drama films
French black-and-white films
French drama films
Portuguese drama films
Silent drama films
1920s French films